Felix Hakobyan (born on 11 March 1981) is an Armenian footballer, currently with Armenian Premier League club Mika Yerevan. He has also been a member of the Armenia national team, has been capped 1 time since his debut in 2007.

External links
 
 Football Federation of Armenia

Living people
1981 births
Armenian footballers
Expatriate footballers in Iran
Damash Iranian players
Armenia international footballers
Ulisses FC players
FC Mika players
Armenian Premier League players
Association football goalkeepers